Aaron Bradshaw is an American basketball player who attends Camden High School in Camden, New Jersey.

Early life and high school career
Bradshaw grew up in Rahway, New Jersey and initially attended Roselle Catholic High School. He transferred to Camden High School in Camden, New Jersey after his freshman year and missed his sophomore basketball season due to academic eligibility issues. Bradshaw averaged 8.9 points, 7.4 rebounds and 3.2 blocks per game as a junior. Bradshaw was selected to play in the 2023 McDonald's All-American Boys Game. He was also named a finalist for the Naismith Prep Player of the Year Award.

Recruiting
Bradshaw is a consensus five-star recruit and one of the top players in the 2023 class, according to major recruiting services. He committed to play college basketball at Kentucky over offers from  Louisville, Texas, UCLA, and USC. Bradshaw also considered playing professionally in the NBA G League.

References

Living people
American men's basketball players
Basketball players from New Jersey
Centers (basketball)
Camden High School (New Jersey) alumni
Roselle Catholic High School alumni
Sportspeople from Rahway, New Jersey
Year of birth missing (living people)